The 1991 Intercontinental Cup was an association football match played on 8 December 1991 between Red Star Belgrade of SFR Yugoslavia, winners of the 1990–91 European Cup, and Colo-Colo of Chile, winners of the 1991 Copa Libertadores. The match was played at the neutral venue of the National Stadium in Tokyo in front of 60,000 fans. Vladimir Jugović was named as man of the match.

Match details

Assistant referees:
Samuel Yam-Ming Chan (Hong Kong)
Kiichiro Tachi (Japan)

See also
1990–91 European Cup
1991 Copa Libertadores
Red Star Belgrade in European football
Srbija do Tokija

References

External links
FIFA Article
UEFA Article

Intercontinental Cup
Intercontinental Cup
Intercontinental Cup
Intercontinental Cup (football)
Intercontinental Cup 1991
Intercontinental Cup 1991
Intercontinental Cup (football) matches hosted by Japan
1991–92 in Yugoslav football
Inter
December 1991 sports events in Asia
1991 in Tokyo
Sports competitions in Tokyo
1991 in association football